Arthur Noel Finlay MC OBE (25 December 1903 – 20 September 1981) was a rugby union player who represented Australia.

Finlay, a lock, was born in Sydney and claimed a total of 12 international rugby caps for Australia.

References

1903 births
1981 deaths
Australia international rugby union players
Australian rugby union players
People educated at Sydney Grammar School
Rugby union players from Sydney
Rugby union locks